The family of Kęstutis, Grand Duke of Lithuania (1381–1382), is listed here. He co-ruled with his brother Algirdas from 1345 to 1377.

Parents 
Gediminas (c. 1275 – winter 1341), Grand Duke of Lithuania (1316–1341)
Jaunė (died in 1344), daughter of Prince Ivan of Polotsk

Wives 
 Name not known, (died c. 1351)
 Birutė (died probably in 1382)

Brothers 
Algirdas (c. 1300 – end of May 1377), Grand Duke of Lithuania (1345–1377)
Manvydas (c. 1300–1348), Duke of Kernavė and Slonim (1341–1348)
Narimantas (baptized Gleb; c. 1300–1348), Duke of Pinsk, Polock and Novgorod
Jaunutis (baptized Iwan; c. 1300 – after 1366), Grand Duke of Lithuania (1341–1345), Duke of Izjaslawl (1346–1366)
Karijotas (baptized Michal; c. 1300 – c. 1362), Prince of Navahradak (1341–1362)
Liubartas (baptized Dymitr; c. 1300–1384), Volodymyr and Luck (1340–1384)

Sisters 
Maria (c. 1300–1349), Princess of Lithuania
Aldona of Lithuania (Anna; after 1309 – 26 May 1339), Princess of Lithuania, Queen of Poland (1333–1339)
Damilla (baptized Elzbieta; died in 1364), Princess of Płock
Eufemija (died on 5 February 1342), Princess of Halicz and Volodymyr-Halicz
Aigustė (Anastazja; died on 11 March 1345), Grand Princess of Vladimir-Moscow

Sons 
Vaidotas (fl. 1362), Duke of Navahrudak
Vaišvilas (died c. 1387)
Butautas (Henryk; died after 1381)
Vytautas the Great  (c. 1350 – 27 October 1430 in Lutsk), Grand Duke of Lithuania (1392–1430)
Tautvilas Kęstutaitis (Conrad; died in September 1390), Prince of Black Ruthenia (1386–1390)
Žygimantas Kęstutaitis (after 1350 – murdered on 20 March 1440), Duke of Trakai, Grand Duke of Lithuania (1432–1440)

Daughters 
Mikova (Maria; died in 1404), Grand Princess of Tver (1375–1404?)
Danutė of Lithuania (Anna; 1362 – 25 May 1448), Princess of Warsaw (1376–1429)
Rimgailė (Elisabeth; died in 1433), Princess of Masovia (4 February – 30 June 1392), Voivodess of Moldavia (1419–1421)

References

Gediminids
Lithuanian noble families